Suzy Peta Menkes  (born 24 December 1943) is a British journalist and fashion critic. Formerly the fashion editor for the International Herald Tribune, Menkes also served as editor, Vogue International, for 25 international editions of Vogue online until October 2020.

Early life and education
Menkes was born in Beaconsfield, Buckinghamshire. She was educated at Brighton and Hove High School. As a teenager in the 1960s, she moved to Paris to study dressmaking at what has now become ESMOD. Her landlady gained her entry into her first couture show at Nina Ricci, which sparked her interest in high fashion.

On her return from Paris, she read history and English literature at Newnham College, Cambridge while her sister studied at Oxford. During her college years, she became the first female editor of the college newspaper.

Career 
After Cambridge, she worked for The Times reporting on fashion. In addition to her journalism, she has written several books, particularly on British Royal style.

Menkes professes to admire "good journalism", especially the work of Prudence Glynn at the Times of London and Eugenia Sheppard of the New York Herald Tribune. After leaving Cambridge in 1966, where she was the first woman who signed up to work for Varsity, and later became its first female Editor-in-Chief, the university's newspaper, she joined The Times as a junior reporter. At age 24, Menkes took her first job as a fashion journalist at the London Evening Standard, where she had been recruited by editor Charles Wintour, who became her mentor.

Then, she joined the Daily Express, before returning to The Times, where she met her late husband and father of her three sons, David Spanier. She left The Times and joined The Independent in 1987, which she later left for the International Herald Tribune in 1988.

After 25 years commenting on fashion at The International Herald Tribune, she left in 2014 saying that:

In 2014, Jonathan Newhouse, chairman of Condé Nast International, appointed her the online voice of Vogue's international editions, working as "a critic and reporter on Vogue's websites across the world". She was also responsible for organising Condé Nast International's annual Luxury Conference.

During the first lockdown of 2020, she launched her podcast, Creative Conversations with Suzy Menkes. Here she presents in-depth interviews with the fashion industry's most influential designers, thinkers and executives, including Duro Olowu, Giancarlo Giammetti, Maria Grazia Chiuri of Dior, Marine Serre, Michael Kors and Natalia Vodianova.

Personal life
Menkes is widowed and has three sons, three granddaughters and three grandsons.  Menkes is a Jewish convert.

Awards and honours
She holds the Legion d'Honneur in France and a British OBE.

Reputation 
Menkes's trademark is her pompadour, an exaggerated hairstyle that was first popularised by Madame de Pompadour, the favourite mistress of King Louis XV, in the 18th century. She has been nicknamed "Samurai Suzy" by the fashion press for her frankness and taste for fashion maximalism.

In November 2009, she appeared as one of the judges on the finale of the Lifetime TV series Project Runway. In 1996, she appeared in the second "Last Shout" special in the British comedy series Absolutely Fabulous, playing herself. In 2016, she appeared in Absolutely Fabulous: The Movie.

Unlike many of her fashion counterparts, Menkes systematically refuses gifts from fashion brands. She openly criticised what she called "The Circus of Fashion" in an article issued in The New York Times in 2013, denouncing the attitude of bloggers and stars followers of street style dressed like "peacocks" to draw the attention of photographers during Fashion week.

During her marriage to David Spanier, she converted to Judaism, and now refrains from attending fashion shows that take place on Holy days. Accessible and curious, Menkes has a reputation for being eager to discuss fashion with young designers. "Like a slightly mad auntie, she is", Kate Moss told The New Yorker magazine, in its 2003 profile of Menkes.

In fashion circles, Menkes is known for her sharp critiques, both positive and negative. In the 1990s, she caused a stir by declaring that Chanel's iconic quilted handbag was "over". In response, Chanel took out a full-page advertisement in the International Herald Tribune refuting her claim. In 2008, she chastised Marc Jacobs for having delayed his runway show by two hours. She is also known for having fostered Nicolas Ghesquière as a fledgling designer, and for predicting the departure of Martin Margiela from Maison Martin Margiela.

In 2013, she held an auction at Christie's online, selling over 80 pieces from her personal wardrobe.

Books 
 How to be a Model, Suzy Menkes. Sphere, 1969, 
 Knitwear Revolution: Designer Patterns to Make, Suzy Menkes. Penguin USA, 1985. 
 The Windsor Style, Suzy Menkes. Salem House, 1987. 
 The Royal Jewels, Suzy Menkes. Contemporary Books, 1990. .
 Queen and Country, Suzy Menkes. Harpercollins, 1993. 
 Hussein Chalayan, Hussein Chalayan, Caroline Evans, Suzy Menkes. NAI, 2005. 
 Manolos new's shoes, Suzy Menkes. Thames &Hudson Ltd, 2010
 Fashion Antwerp Academy 50, Suzy Menkes.Lannoo, 2013
  The Fashion World of Jean Paul Gaultier: From the Sidewalk to the Catwalk, Suzy Menkes.Harry N.Abrams, 2001
 Jazz Age Fashion: Dressed to Kill, Suzy Menkes, Daisy Bates, Virgiia Bates. Rizzoli, 2013.
  XL-FASHION DESIGNERS A-Z, Steele, Valerie, Suzy Menkes. Taschen, 2013. 
  XL-FASHION DESIGNERS A-Z MISSO, Steele, Valerie, Suzy Menkes. Taschen, 2013.
 XL-FASHION DESIGNERS A-Z PRADA, Steele, Valerie, Suzy Menkes.Taschen, 2012.
 XL- FASHION DESIGNERS A-Z AKR, Steele, Valerie, Suzy Menkes.Taschen, 2012.
 XL-FASHION DESIGNERS A-Z ETRO, Steele, Valerie, Suzy Menkes.Taschen, 2012.
  XL-FASHION DESIGNERS A-Z STELL, Steele, Valerie, Suzy Menkes. Taschen, 2012
 Valentino, Matt Tyrnauer, Suzy Menkes.Taschen, 2009
 Knitwear Revolution: Designer Patterns to Make, Suzy Menkes. Penguin Books, 1985
 Dolls For The Princesses: The Story Of France And Marianne, Suzy Menkes, Faith Eaton. Royal Collection Enterprises, 2005

References

External links 

 Profile interview of Menkes by John Seabrook, The New Yorker, 17 March 2001
 Profile of Menkes, Varsity newspaper, Cambridge University, 25 November 2005, p. 11 (.pdf file)

1943 births
British expatriates in France
British fashion journalists
Living people
People from Kettering
People educated at Brighton and Hove High School
Alumni of Newnham College, Cambridge
International Herald Tribune people
The Times people
Recipients of the Legion of Honour
Officers of the Order of the British Empire
American women journalists
Jewish American journalists
21st-century American Jews
21st-century American women